Doug Morency is a Canadian actor and comedian who was a member of The Second City comedy troupe and The Williamson Playboys. He played Al Gore in a comedy show about global warming called An Inconvenient Musical.

Morency has won three Canadian Comedy Awards; two for Best Male Improviser (2003 and 2005) and one for Best Comedic Play in 2004.

Filmography

Film

Television

References

External links
 Official home page for Doug Morency
 

Year of birth missing (living people)
Living people
Canadian sketch comedians
Canadian Comedy Award winners